The 2012–13 Oakland Golden Grizzlies men's basketball team represented Oakland University during the 2012–13 NCAA Division I men's basketball season. The Golden Grizzlies, led by 29th year head coach Greg Kampe, played their home games at the Athletics Center O'rena and were members of The Summit League. They finished the season 16–17, 10–6 in The Summit League to finish in fourth place. They lost in the quarterfinals of The Summit League tournament to Fort Wayne. They were invited to the 2013 CIT where they lost in the first round to Youngstown State. This was the Golden Grizzlies last year as a member of The Summit League as they joined the Horizon League in the 2013–14 season.

Preseason
Oakland was selected to finish third in The Summit League in the preseason poll of coaches, sports information directors and media. Junior guard Travis Bader was selected to the preseason all-league first team and senior forward Drew Valentine was selected to the second team.

From the previous season's 20-win team that reached the CollegeInsider.com Tournament semifinals, Oakland lost starting point guard Reggie Hamilton and guard Laval Lucas-Perry to graduation. Then-redshirt freshman center Kyle Sikora transferred to Stetson in order to be closer to his family.

Season
Sophomore center Corey Petros earned league Player of the Week honors on November 19. Petros earned his first career award averaging 18 points and 9.5 rebounds in road games against Boise State and Pittsburgh.

Junior guard Duke Mondy was named Player of the Week for the week of December 31.

After a 47-point performance and averaging 36.5 points per game the week of January 20, Bader was named National Player of the Week by ESPN's Dick Vitale, the Capital One Impact Performance of the Week and The Summit League's Player of the Week awards. In the 47-point game, Bader set an Oakland single-game record for three-point field goals made (11), scored the most points in a game in NCAA Division I this year and tied the league record for most three-pointers in a game. The 47 points were the third-highest total in Oakland history.

Roster

Schedule

|-
!colspan=9 style=| Exhibition

|-
!colspan=9 style=| Regular season

|-
!colspan=9 style=| Summit League tournament

|-
!colspan=9 style=| CollegeInsider.com tournament

References

External links
 Official site

Oakland Golden Grizzlies men's basketball seasons
Oakland
Oakland
Oakland Golden Grizzlies men's basketball
Oakland Golden Grizzlies men's basketball